This is a list of heads of state of Mauritius since the independence of Mauritius in 1968.

From 1968 to 1992 the head of state under the Mauritius Independence Act 1968 was the Queen of Mauritius, Elizabeth II, who was also the monarch of the United Kingdom and the other Commonwealth realms. The Queen was represented in Mauritius by a governor-general. Mauritius became a republic under the Constitution of 1992 and the monarch and governor-general were replaced by a ceremonial president.

In 1992, Mauritius became a republic within the Commonwealth of Nations. Queen Elizabeth II ceased to be head of state, Queen of Mauritius; the last governor-general, Sir Veerasamy Ringadoo, was appointed the first president of Mauritius. The president is elected by the National Assembly for a five-year term. In the event of a vacancy the vice-president of Mauritius serves as acting head of state.

Monarchy (1968–1992)
The succession to the throne was the same as the succession to the British throne.

Governors-general (1968–1992)

The governor-general was the representative of the monarch in Mauritius and exercised most of the powers of the monarch. The governor-general was appointed for an indefinite term, serving at the pleasure of the monarch. After the passage of the Statute of Westminster 1931, the governor-general was appointed solely on the advice of the Cabinet of Mauritius without the involvement of the British government. In the event of a vacancy the chief justice served as Officer Administering the Government.

Republic (1992–present)
Under the 1992 constitution, the constitution of the Republic of Mauritius, the president replaced the monarch as ceremonial head of state. The president was elected by the National Assembly for a five-year term. In the event of a vacancy the vice president served as acting president.

List of presidents
Parties

Timeline

Footnotes 
 Served as Chief Justice of Mauritius.

References

External links
 World Statesmen – Mauritius
 Rulers.org – Mauritius

Government of Mauritius
H